Diabolus in Musica can refer to:

Music
 The diabolus in musica, the tritone, a certain musical interval
 Diabolus in Musica (ensemble) (1992–present) a French medieval ensemble
 Diabulus in Musica, a Spanish symphonic metal band

Albums
 Diabolus in Musica, a 1998 album by Slayer
 Diabolus in Musica, Accardo interpreta Paganini, an album by Salvatore Accardo

Songs
 "Diabulus in musica", a song by Mägo de Oz on their album Gaia II: La Voz Dormida, also released as a single